Beazer is a hamlet in southern Alberta, Canada within Cardston County, located  south of Highway 5, approximately  southwest of Lethbridge.  It is named in 1900 after Mark Beazer who organized the first congregation of the Church of Jesus Christ of Latter-day Saints (LDS Church) there.

Demographics 
The population of Beazer according to the 2008 municipal census conducted by Cardston County is 11.

See also 
List of communities in Alberta
List of hamlets in Alberta

References 

Cardston County
Hamlets in Alberta
Latter-day Saint settlements in Canada
1900 establishments in the Northwest Territories